Loftus may refer to:

People
 Loftus (surname), a list of people with the surname
 Loftus (given name), a list of people with the given name

Places
 Loftus, New South Wales, a suburb of Sydney, Australia
 Loftus, North Yorkshire, a town in Redcar and Cleveland, England
 Loftus Glacier, Victoria Land, Antarctica

Titles
 Viscount Loftus, a title created three times in the Peerage of Ireland
 Baron Loftus, a title in the Peerage of the United Kingdom
 Loftus baronets, two baronetcies in Ireland

Transportation
 Loftus Street, a major north-south road the Perth suburbs of Subiaco and West Perth, Western Australia
 Loftus railway station, Sydney, Australia
 Loftus railway station, a disused railway station in Redcar and Cleveland, England

Arts and entertainment
 Loftus (band), an American indie rock band
 Professor Geoffrey Loftus, a character in the British comedy series Doctor in the House

See also
 Loftus Hall, a building in County Wexford, Ireland, that is said to have been haunted by the devil
 Loftus Road, a football stadium in London, the home ground of Queens Park Rangers
 Loftus Versfeld Stadium, Pretoria, South Africa
 Lofthouse (disambiguation)